Hindsiclava resina is a species of sea snail, a marine gastropod mollusk in the family Pseudomelatomidae.

This species was questionably placed in synonymy with Hindsiclava militaris

Description
The length of the shell varies between 30 mm and 75 mm.

(Original description) The decollate, fusiform shell is moderately large, slender and solid. The spire is longer than the aperture . The shell has  a broad, somewhat constricted anal fasciole and closely appressed suture, the fasciole chiefly sculptured by incremental lines. The whorls show an angle at the shoulder where terminate (on the penultimate whorl twenty) straight, somewhat protractive, low, narrow, rather sharp axial ribs. These extend forward on the body whorl nearly to the base. Incremental lines are rather prominent. The spiral sculpture consists of a few faint striae on the fasciole,  between the fasciole and the next suture on the spire of five or six strap-like ridges with narrower interspaces often containing an obscure small intercalary thread, overriding the ribs without nodulation at the intersections. On the body whorl these ridges extend, somewhat diminishing in size, forward to the end of the siphonal canal, occasionally divided by a medial incised line, and with few intercalary threads, numbering about twenty-five in all. The aperture is narrow. The outer lip is defective, but by the lines of growth not much produced. The anal sulcus is shallow and pronounced. The posterior angle of the aperture is produced, much thickened and recurved. The columella is straight, smooth, callous, its axis impervious. The siphonal canal is straight and rather wide. The interior of the outer lip is smooth.

Distribution
This species occurs in the Pacific Ocean from Panama to Peru

References

 B. Landau and C. Marques da Silva. 2010. Early Pliocene gastropods of Cubagua, Venezuela: Taxonomy, palaeobiogeography and ecostratigraphy. Palaeontos 19:1-221

External links
 Dall (1919) Descriptions of new species of Mollusca from the North Pacific Ocean; Proceedings of the U.S. National Museum, vol. 56 (1920) 
 
 

resina
Gastropods described in 1908